The western nesomys (Nesomys lambertoni), also known as the lowland red forest rat, is a species of rat endemic to Madagascar. They are suspected to reside within the nooks and crannies of the canyons of the Bemaraha.

References

Nesomys
Mammals of Madagascar
Mammals described in 1928
Mammals
Rats